The Margraviate of Antwerp (or Mark of Antwerp) consisted since the eleventh century of the area around the cities of Antwerp and Breda.

Origin 
Under Otto II, emperor of the Holy Roman Empire, several marches were created along the border with West Francia (this border coincided with the river Scheldt). Originally the mark was restricted to the borders of the Scheldt, in 994 Ansfried of Utrecht added Toxandria to the mark.

History 

In the 11th century the mark of Antwerp was one of the fiefs of the duke of Lower Lorraine. Godfrey of Bouillon received the mark in 1076 from emperor Henry IV. After his death in the Crusader state of Jerusalem in 1100, Henry I of Limburg was appointed as margrave.

In 1106 the duchy of Lower Lorraine and the margraviate were united. After the abolishment of the duchy in 1190 during the Diet of Schwäbisch Hall by Emperor Henry VI only its titles remained and these were given to the duke of Brabant.

Composition 
The margraviate consisted (after the loss of Breda) of the cities of Antwerp, Herentals and Lier and the quarters of Arkel, Rijen, Geel, Zandhoven, Turnhout and Hoogstraten.

Margraves of Antwerp 
974–1002 Godfrey I, Count of Verdun
1005–1044 Gothelo I the Great
1044–1046 Gothelo II the Lazy
1046–1065 Frederick of Luxembourg
1065–1069 Godfrey III the Bearded
1069–1070 Baldwin VI, Count of Flanders
1070–1076 Godfrey IV the Hunchback
1076–1100 Godfrey of Bouillon
1101–1106 Henry I of Limbourg
1106–1139 Godfrey I, Count of Louvain
1139–1142 Godfrey II, Count of Louvain
1142–1190 Godfrey III, Count of Louvain
1427 Klaas Kersmakers

References

Antwerp
Antwerp
History of Antwerp Province
History of North Brabant